"Ch!pz in Black (Who You Gonna Call)" is the debut single of Dutch pop music group Ch!pz. In the Netherland, the song reached  2 on the Dutch Top 40 and No. 1 on the Single Top 100. The track also became a hit in several other European countries, reaching the top three in Austria, Germany, Sweden, and Switzerland.

Charts

Weekly charts

Year-end charts

Decade-end charts

Certifications

References

2003 debut singles
2003 songs
Ch!pz songs